Athletics was one of the nine sports of the 2017 Commonwealth Youth Games. The events were staged at the Thomas Robinson Stadium in Nassau, Bahamas between 20 and 23 July, shortly after the 2017 World U18 Championships in Athletics.

Medal summary

Boys

Girls

Mixed

Medal table

References

External links
Official website
Results

Commonwealth Youth Games
Athletics
2017
2017 Commonwealth Youth Games